Q-par Angus was a designer and manufacturer of microwave and RF antennas for commercial and defense use; in May 2013 the company was acquired by Solid State PLC.

The company was formed in 1973 in Birmingham, UK, by Dr Richard Holliday and his wife Jenny Holliday.

Following the acquisition of Q-Par Angus by Solid State Plc, operations have continued and grown as part of Steatite Ltd under the Steatite antennas name.

Some of their products include:-

Antenna Positioners
Horn antennas
Reflector Antennas
Broadcast Antennas
Sinuous / Spiral Antennas
Helical Antennas
Radar Antennas
Omnidirectional Antennas

References

Engineering consulting firms of the United Kingdom